Lizard Creek may refer to:

in Canada
 Lizard Creek (Elk River), a tributary of the Elk River in British Columbia

in the United States
 Lizard Creek (Iowa), a stream
 Lizard Creek (Pennsylvania), a tributary of the Lehigh River

See also